Nato is a town and commune in Madagascar. It belongs to the district of Vohipeno, which is a part of Vatovavy-Fitovinany Region. The population of the commune was estimated to be approximately 9,000 in 2001 commune census.

Only primary schooling is available. The majority, being 98%, of the population of the commune are farmers, while an additional 1% receives their livelihood from raising livestock. The most important crops are rice and coffee, while other important agricultural products are lychee and cassava. Services provide employment for 0.5% of the population. Additionally fishing employs 0.5% of the population.

References and notes 

Populated places in Vatovavy-Fitovinany